is a Japanese manga artist. She is best known for her Hayate × Blade series which is licensed in English by Seven Seas Entertainment, and the manga adaptation of the anime Please Teacher!.

Works
  (2000, serialized in Dengeki Daioh, ASCII Media Works)
  (2001-2003, serialized in Dengeki Daioh, ASCII Media Works)
  (2002-2003,  serialized in Dengeki Daioh, ASCII Media Works) 
  (2004-2008,  serialized in Dengeki Daioh, ASCII Media Works) (2008 reprint vol. 1–8, Shueisha) (2008-ongoing, serialized in Ultra Jump, Shueisha) 
 Ultra Sword (2004)
  (2006, serialized in Sylph, ASCII Media Works)
  (2006-2009 Ichijinsha)

References

External links

Manga artists from Saitama Prefecture
Living people
Year of birth missing (living people)